The Société Honoraire de Français (French National Honor Society) is an organization whose intent is to recognize high school students in the United States who have maintained excellent grades in at least three semesters of French language courses; this is done by induction into the organization.

Induction
At induction, the SHF history is usually read, culminating with the lighting of candles. Each student holds a candle, and the student next to him or her recites the motto, Avoir une autre langue, c'est posséder une deuxième âme, which means To have another language is to have a second soul. All the members are considered inducted when the last candle is lit.

Duties
Community service is mandatory for the organization, as well as a high grade point average overall (at least a B average in all other courses), in addition to an A in French classes during the semester of selection.

See also
American Association of Teachers of French
German National Honor Society
National Honor Society
Spanish National Honor Society
Pi Delta Phi, the French National Honor Society (for U.S. college and university students)

References

External links
La Société Honoraire de Français

High school honor societies